Alby Barlow (born 1916) was an Australian racing cyclist from 1935 who road for Oakleigh. In 1947 he was the Australian 100 miles road champion  and holder of the 25, 50 and 100 miles Australian unpaced road records

In 1936 Barlow won the Melbourne to Sale on a handicap of 16'. He also rode the Warrnambool to Melbourne off a handicap of 9', finishing 50th.  Despite his prominence as a road rider, Barlow never featured in the results of the Warrnambool.  In 1947 he was part of a disappointing scratch group that finished 5' 26" down on the fastest time of Keith Rowley.

While best known for his road racing, he also competed on the track. In 1937 he won a 5-mile points race at Bendigo.

Barlow was third fastest in the Goulburn to Sydney in 1938, behind Bill Moritz. In November he travelled to Nouméa as part of a team supported by the Referee, which reported that on 1 January 1939 Barlow won two track events and finished second in an eight-lap event and created two records, and followed that up with a win in a road race over 2 days.

He was third to Dean Toseland in the Sale Grand Prix, and rode well in the Tour of Gippsland. He was initially suspended for one month for accepting assistance from a rider who had abandoned, threatening his participation in the Sydney six-day race. At the end of the year he was rated as the 7th best professional road rider in Australia.

The Mt Gambier 100 which in 1947 carried with it the title of Australian 100 miles road champion, was on the second race Barlow finished in 1947. He defeated Keith Thurgood, Les Dunne and Max Rowley in a new course record.

In late 1947 Barlow broke a series of unpaced road records, starting with the record for  out and home in 1hr 1' 17" breaking the time of Frankie Thomas from 1933.  He followed that up with records for  out and home in 2hr 11' 10", riding the first  in 56' 25". He then set his sights on the  record which he set with a time of 4hr 39' 12" on December 15.

In Barlow's words, "I got the pants towelled off me in the Grand Prix Des Nations, but went much better in the other two races." Barlow travelled to Valkenburg, the Netherlands for the UCI Road World Championships however he was hit by another rider whilst training over the course and was forced to withdraw. Barlow was reported to have entered the 1949 Paris–Roubaix, however it is unclear if he started the race. In any event he did not finish.

In 1949 he was riding the United States, with his first objective a trans America record attempt, but was delayed by snowfall in Arizona.  He rode in a six-day event in New York at the end of February 1950 but walked off the track after 3 days following a dispute with race official Reggie McNamara, the former Australian champion.

Palmares

1936
1st Melbourne to Sale 
1939
1st Melbourne - Bendigo 
1947
1st Australian 100 miles road championship 
Australian records for 25, 50 and 100 miles  (40, 80 and 160 km)
1948
 unplaced Grand Prix des Nations
 unplaced Esperazza Grand Prix
 unplaced Nantes Grand Prix
 DNS UCI Road World Championships

References

External links

1916 births
Year of death missing
Australian male cyclists
Place of birth missing
Cyclists from Victoria (Australia)
People from Gisborne, Victoria